Northwest Omaha is a community area in Omaha, Nebraska. It holds several neighborhoods. The area is loosely bound by West Maple Road to the south, the Douglas-Washington County line to the north, Elkhorn to the west, and McKinley Street, I-680, and 72nd Street to the east.

Neighborhoods
Northwest Omaha's neighborhoods are racially and economically diverse. Bennington, Irvington, sub-divisions along Blair High Road, sub-divisions around Standing Bear Lake, and the Briggs Neighborhood.

Landmarks
Some landmarks of the area are Omaha Northwest High School, the closed roller skating rink in Irvington, Tranquility Park, 20 Grand Movie Theatre, and the new Bennington High School.

See also
 Neighborhoods of Omaha, Nebraska
 Landmarks in Omaha, Nebraska

West Omaha, Nebraska